Quay is an unincorporated community in Quay County, New Mexico, United States It is located approximately  south of Tucumcari on New Mexico State Road 209.

History
Settlement of the community of Quay began circa 1902. In 1904, the community received its official name following the establishment of its post office. The name "Quay" honors Matthew S. Quay, a Civil War veteran who became a U.S. Senator from Pennsylvania in 1887. While in office, Quay became a proponent of statehood for the Territory of New Mexico and was appreciated throughout the state for his efforts. New Mexico was admitted as the 47th state in the Union on January 6, 1912. Sometime before 1926, the settlement was moved  to the northwest to its present location near the newly constructed New Mexico State Highway 209, which stretches through the broad valley known as Quay Valley.

Climate

See also

 Eastern New Mexico
 Llano Estacado
 Caprock Escarpment
 Tucumcari Mountain
 Lucianosaurus

References

External links

 Quay County, New Mexico
 

Unincorporated communities in Quay County, New Mexico
Unincorporated communities in New Mexico